George Smith (1799 – 15 September 1839) was an English cricketer who was associated with Sheffield Cricket Club and made his first-class debut in 1827. He played for Sheffield from 1827 to 1836.

References

1799 births
1839 deaths
English cricketers
English cricketers of 1826 to 1863
Sheffield Cricket Club cricketers